Rodéric Filippi (born 25 February 1989) was a French professional footballer who last played as a centre-back for Gazélec Ajaccio.

Career
Filippi joined Ajaccio in 2007. However, he never made a senior appearance for the club.

In 2009, Filippi joined Gazélec Ajaccio on a free transfer. In seven years with the club, he made 165 league appearances, scoring 16 goals. In 2016, Gazélec released Filippi, and he became a free agent.

In September 2016, Tours signed Filippi.
In 2019 after three seasons with Tours FC, he joigned once again Gazélec Ajaccio who suffered relegation.

After 3 seasons and a half at the club, he decided to retire in January 2023, with Gazélec Ajaccio facing serious financial problems, and who was forced to end its participation in Championnat National 3.

External links

Rodéric Filippi foot-national.com Profile

1989 births
Living people
People from La Seyne-sur-Mer
Association football defenders
French footballers
Ligue 2 players
Championnat National players
Gazélec Ajaccio players
Tours FC players
Sportspeople from Var (department)
French people of Corsican descent
Footballers from Provence-Alpes-Côte d'Azur